Palmeira Futebol Clube da Una, commonly known as Palmeira, is a Brazilian football club based in Goianinha, Rio Grande do Norte state.

History
The club was founded on June 23, 1959. Palmeira finished in the second place in the Campeonato Potiguar Second Level in 2010, thus gaining promotion to the following year's first level.

Stadium
Palmeira Futebol Clube da Una play their home games at Estádio José Nazareno do Nascimento, nicknamed Nazarenão. The stadium has a maximum capacity of 3,000 people.

Honours
Campeonato Potiguar Second Division
 Winners (2):2018,2020

References

Football clubs in Rio Grande do Norte
Association football clubs established in 1959
1959 establishments in Brazil